Paeniglutamicibacter gangotriensis is a bacterium from the genus Paeniglutamicibacter which has been isolated from soil from the station Dakshin Gangotri in Antarctica.

References

External links
Type strain of Paeniglutamicibacter gangotriensis at BacDive -  the Bacterial Diversity Metadatabase

Bacteria described in 2004
Micrococcaceae